JOCH-DTV, branded as , is the Chūkyō metropolitan area flagship station of the Nippon News Network and Nippon Television Network System (NNS), owned by Nippon Television Holdings through . Its studios are located in Showa-ku, Nagoya, Japan.

The Chūkyō UHF TV Broadcasting Co., Ltd. (中京ユー・エッチ・エフテレビ放送株式会社, former corporate name of Chūkyō TV) was founded on March 1, 1968, and started TV broadcasting on April 1, 1969.  Then the company was renamed "Chūkyō TV Broadcasting Co., Ltd. (中京テレビ放送株式会社)" on April 1, 1970.

Broadcasting

Analog
JOCH-TV (as of 1969/04/01 open date and 2011/07/24 end date)
Nagoya: Channel 35
Toyohashi: Channel 58
Gifu-Nagara: Channel 47
Tajimi: Channel 59
Nakatsugawa: Channel 26
Takayama: Channel 26
Ise: Channel 47
Toba: Channel 36
Isobe: Channel 39
Nabari: Channel 54, etc.

Digital
JOCH-DTV (as 2003/12/01 open date)
Button: 4
Nagoya: Channel 19
Toyohashi: Channel 17
Chuno: Channel 17
Nakatsugawa: Channel 17
Takayama: Channel 17
Ise: Channel 17
Nabari: Channel 19

Programmes (Times in JST)

Now on air

in Aichi Prefecture, Gifu Prefecture, and Mie Prefecture
SAKAE TA☆RO - from 24:25 till 24:55 every Friday: a late-night variety show on location in Sakae, Naka-ku, Nagoya
PS - from 22:30 till 23:30 every Sunday: information about restaurants in Nagoya
catch! - from 15:50 till 19:00 every weekday

all over Japan 
Super Chample (スーパーチャンプル) - from 24:29 till 24:59 every Wednesday: features street dance

Past

in Aichi Prefecture, Gifu Prefecture, and Mie Prefecture
Goji Satur Magazine (5時SATマガジン) - from April 1981 till September 1993: features Japanese rock music
Vivian (ヴィヴィアン) - from September 1987 till March 1994: a variety show for working women
Radio de Gomen (ラジオDEごめん) - from October 1988 till March 1991: a late-night TV program like a radio program
Kosakai Kazuki no Renai Senka Irokoi Zaurusu (小堺一機の恋愛専科 色恋ざうるす) - from October 1991 till September 1993: a late-night variety show by Kazuki Kosakai
Denpa Kessha Bababa Dan (電波結社バババ団) - from October 1993 till March 1995: an evening variety show
Kyaīn no Gyaronpa (キャイ~ンのギャロンパ) - from October 1997 till September 2000: a late-night variety show by Kyaīn
And U (アンデュ) - from 09:25 till 10:20 every Saturday: features young women's trend

all over Japan 
Owarai Manga Dōjō (お笑いマンガ道場) - from April 1976 till March 1994: a variety show by Japanese cartoonists
Sarudie (サルヂエ) - from October 2005 till January 2007, produced by Nippon TV and Chūkyō TV: a quiz show by Takashi Fujii
Gyōkai Quiz Minikite! (業界クイズ ミニキテ!) - from October 2007 till March 2008: a quiz show about industries and professions

Other TV stations in Nagoya
Tōkai Television Broadcasting (THK, affiliated with CX and FNN / FNS) - 1
Chubu-Nippon Broadcasting Co.,Ltd (CBC, affiliated with TBS TV and JNN) - 5
Nagoya Broadcasting Network (NBN, affiliated with TV Asahi and ANN) - 6
Aichi Television Broadcasting (TVA, affiliated with TV Tokyo and TX Network) - 10

See also
The city of Nagoya
Chūkyō Metropolitan Area

External links
Official website of Chūkyō TV (Japanese)

Television stations in Nagoya
Nippon News Network
Television channels and stations established in 1969
Yagoto